Joyce Heron (born 28 October 1964) is a British judoka. She competed in the women's extra-lightweight event at the 1996 Summer Olympics.

Judo career
Heron came to prominence in 1992 when she became champion of Great Britain, winning the bantamweight division at the British Judo Championships. She successfully defended her title in 1993 and 1994. In 1993, she won the bronze medal at the 1993 World Judo Championships in Hamilton.

In 1995, she won a bronze medal at the 1995 European Judo Championships in Birmingham. She won a fourth British title in 1996 and was selected to represent Great Britain at the 1996 Olympic Games in Atlanta, competing in the women's 48 kg category she was eliminated by eventual bronze medallist Yolanda Soler. In 1998, she won her fifth and last British Championship.

Personal life
She teaches masterclasses in Judo.

References

External links
 

1964 births
Living people
British female judoka
Olympic judoka of Great Britain
Judoka at the 1996 Summer Olympics
Place of birth missing (living people)
European Games medalists in judo